Christian Zacharias (born 27 April 1950 in Jamshedpur) is a German pianist and conductor.

Music career
Zacharias studied piano with Irene Slavin and Vlado Perlemuter in Paris. He won second prize at both the Geneva Competition in 1969 and the Van Cliburn Competition in 1973. After winning the Ravel Competition in Paris in 1975, he launched an international career. He has performed chamber music with such partners as the Alban Berg Quartet, the Guarneri Quartet, the Leipzig String Quartet, Heinrich Schiff, and Frank Peter Zimmermann. He made many recordings, among them a 1979 recording of 33 sonatas by Domenico Scarlatti, the complete Schubert piano sonatas, the complete Mozart piano concertos (available on EMI classics), and the complete Beethoven piano concertos.

He began his conducting career in 1992 with the Orchestre de la Suisse Romande in Geneva. He made his US debut in 2000 with the Los Angeles Philharmonic. Since 2000, he has been artistic director of the Lausanne Chamber Orchestra.  Since 2002, he has been principal guest conductor of the Gothenburg Symphony Orchestra, and since 2009 he has been an Artistic Partner with the Saint Paul Chamber Orchestra.

References

External links
 IMG Artists Full Biography 
 Christian Zacharias official website

1950 births
EMI Classics and Virgin Classics artists
Living people
German classical pianists
Male classical pianists
German male conductors (music)
Prize-winners of the Van Cliburn International Piano Competition
21st-century German conductors (music)
21st-century classical pianists
21st-century German male musicians